Hellula hydralis, the cabbage centre grub, is a moth of the family Crambidae. It was described by Achille Guenée in 1854 and is found throughout Australia.

The wingspan is about 20 mm.

The larvae feed on Brassica oleracea and Brassica napus.

References

Glaphyriini
Moths of New Zealand
Moths described in 1854